WXZZ (103.3 FM, "Z-Rock 103") is a commercial radio station.  It is licensed to Georgetown, Kentucky and serves the Lexington-Fayette Metropolitan Area.  The station is owned by Cumulus Media and airs an active rock radio format.  Cumulus uses the Z Rock name as a moniker for WXZZ, as a way to keep the trademark active following the closure of the Z Rock satellite network of the same name in 1996.  Studios and offices are located at Kincaid Towers on West Vine Street in Lexington.  The transmitter is off Russell Cave Road, also in Lexington.

WXZZ begins each weekday with the comedy and music program Twitch & the Z Rock Morning Show.  Weeknights, WXZZ carries the nationally syndicated show Two Hours with Matt Pinfield.  WXZZ airs two weekend syndicated programs: The House of Hair with Dee Snider on Saturday nights, and Out of Order with Jed the Fish on Sunday mornings.

The station first signed on the air on September 10, 1973, as WAXU-FM.  It was originally at 103.1 MHz, and it simulcast its co-owned AM station, 1580 WAXU (now WWTF).

References

External links
ZRock 103 Homepage

XZZ
Radio stations established in 1986
1986 establishments in Kentucky
Cumulus Media radio stations
Georgetown, Kentucky